Jay Valentine was an American Negro league outfielder in the 1910s.

Valentine made his Negro leagues debut in 1914 with the Philadelphia Giants. He went on to play for the Hilldale Club in 1917.

References

External links
Baseball statistics and player information from Baseball-Reference Black Baseball Stats and Seamheads

Year of birth missing
Year of death missing
Place of birth missing
Place of death missing
Hilldale Club players
Philadelphia Giants players